The Govind Ballabh Pant Social Science Institute (GBPSSI) is a research institute located in Jhusi, Allahabad, in India. It is one of the total 14 institutes establishments in all India established by Indian Council of Social Science and Research.

Established in 1980 as one in the network of Social Science Research Institutes, which Indian Council of Social Science Research (ICSSR) set up in association with the state governments, the institute entered privileges of the University of Allahabad in 2005. The institute undertakes interdisciplinary research in the field of social sciences. The main areas of research at the Institute include development planning and policy, environment, health and population, human development, rural development and management, culture, power and change, democracy and institutions.

Hisrorian and cultural anthropologist Professor Badri Narayan is the director of the institute.

History 

The G. B. Pant Samajik Vigyan Sansthan (Social Science Institute) was set up at the initiative of the government of Uttar Pradesh. Pd. Kamalapati Tripathi, the then chief minister of UP wrote a letter to Shri S. Nurul Hasan, Education Minister, government of India, in 1972, expressing the desire of the government of UP to set up an Institute for Social Science Research at Allahabad. The proposal was backed by two subsequent chief ministers of the state.

The government of India subsequently constituted a committee under the chairmanship of Prof S. Chakravarty, Member, Planning Commission, to work out the details. The committee recommended in 1975 that a non-recurring grant-in-aid of Rs. 50 lakh be made to the institute, to be shared equally by the ICSSR and the GoUP, and a recurring grant of Rs. 10 lakh be made to the Institute per year, to be shared equally by the iCSSR and the GoUP. On the recommendation of the Chakravarty committee, the government of India decided in 1975 to approve the request of the UP government to set up an Institute in Allahabad in collaboration with the Central government. It was decided that the proposed Institute would be supported under the grants-in-aid scheme of the ICSSR for financial assistance to Research Institutes doing research in the field of social sciences.  It was further decided that the government of India and the UP government would provide funds to the institute on a matching basis. This recommendation was accepted in principle by both the ICSSR and the GoUP.

The Indian Council for Social Science Research started providing funds to the Institute starting from 1976 to 1977. Subsequently, the Government of Uttar Pradesh took a decision to fund the institute on a matching basis from 1979 to 1980 and an initial grant of Rupees one lakh was made to the Institute in July 1979.

The institute was registered as a society in the year 1980 by representatives of the government of UP, the central government, and the ICSSR.  Prof. A. D. Pant, became the director of the institute after it became a registered entity in 1980, succeeding Prof. S. C. Dube who was director of the institute up to 1979

The institute became a constituent institute of the University of Allahabad, after the university became a central university in July 2005. Its structure and its relationship with the University of Allahabad is now governed by the ordinances of the university. Specifically, Ordinance XXXIV of the University of Allahabad lays down the basic structure of the constituent institutes of the university. The central government also decided to fund the institute through the UGC and the University of Allahabad

Campus 
The campus is situated on the National Highway No, 2, also called the famous G.T. Road (also linking Allahabad to Varanasi). It is about 10 km. from Allahabad Junction Railway station and 1 km. from Triveni Sangam. The institute has a lush green and clean campus spread over 10 acres. It has its own water supply system. As a supportive measure for uninterrupted power supply, the institute has installed a 62.5 KVAelectricity generator.

Library
The institute has a large and modern library that serves as a national collection of books, archival material, journals and recent documentation for studies and research and development, management and ethnography. The institute's library is recognized as a national centre of information and regional resource centre. It has over 50,000 books, archival material and documentation of studies and research in almost all social science disciplines and subscribes 150 national and international journals. The library has access to INFLIBNET. It is fully air conditioned with huge hall for reading purposes with necessary facilities like computer, photocopier, microfilm reader etc.

Computer Centre

The institute is fully equipped with latest IT infrastructure, which includes two servers (HCL Infiniti Global Line Server Intel Xeon Two Processor Quad Core), 67 HP Thin Clients), 40 desktops and 10 laptops connected with wired as well as wireless network. Software like SPSS, ArcGIS, ERDAS, Gram Plus, Libsys, Microsoft Project, Microsoft Office and Tally 9 ERP are available. The institute has also subscribed for INFLIBNET which enabled the scholars for accessing all reputed journals online.

Academics

Academic programmes 
The only Post Graduate professional course apart from research courses (P.hd/M.Phil/D.Phil/and Various Fellowships) offered by the institute is the two year full time Masters of Business Administration- Rural Development, MBA (RD) which was initiated in 2001.

Admission
Mode of Admission to this institute is only by completing an entrance exam organized by the University of Allahabad.

Manav Vikas Sangrahalaya (The Museum of Development of Man) 
The museum is a part of GBPSSI. It has four permanent galleries and occasional temporary exhibits. The permanent galleries feature the cultural archeological history of India, the physical and cultural archeological history of the Ganges river basin, photo exhibits of the history of Hinduism's Bhakti movement, and a gallery featuring the history of migration.

The Manav Vikas Sangrahalaya came into being in January 2001. This museum aims at preserving and highlighting the folk cultures, local traditions and heritage of our country. In this respect it is different from other archaeological museums as it portrays the living, vibrant and dynamic aspects of Indian folk and cultural traditions which have played a role in the socio-economic development of the country, particularly UP and its neighboring regions. Besides preserving and providing sustenance to cultural attributes of the society such as tribal and folk arts, literature, sports, local skills etc., it also aims to preserve and document indigenous knowledge systems in various areas and also tools, technologies and modes of production.

Display Section :

The display section of the museum is an integral and complementary part of the research wing. The artifacts displayed focus on art and culture of different communities of our nation. Dioramas, replicas and other visuals show how people of various regions have passed through different phases of culture and change. At present there are two galleries in the museum. The first is the Manav Vikas ki Katha and the second one is the Ganga River Culture gallery. The gallery displaying Manav Vikas ki Katha highlights the march of civilization since prehistoric times. It presents a coherent history of the development, particularly, socio-economic, of human civilization in the specific context of north India. The other gallery, namely the Ganga River Culture gallery represents the socioeconomic and cultural continuity and change along the entire Ganga River belt through large paintings, photographs, artifacts and models.

Outreach activities

Apart from its display unit the museum is also involved in carrying out academic research, popular activities and interventions activities that aim to reach out to lesser-known marginalized communities. In the process also disseminates knowledge among the general public about these communities. Since its inception in 2001 the museum has been organizing various workshops and training programmes for children during the summer vacations under the banners of Art for Social Change and Theatre for Social Change. Every year a programme called Chetna Parva (a social knowledge awareness programme) is conducted for school children in which children belonging to different schools of the city visit the museum and are given a popular lecture by eminent social scientists on important social issues. Training programmes are also organized for women in which they are taught indigenous skills that can help to empower them economically and socially.

As a part of the intervention activities among marginalized communities the museum has been carrying out various programmes to enhance the cultural identity of marginalized communities through their cultural skills, traditions and performances. Under its programme on Identity and Development workshops like Zindagi Nadi Kinare (with the Nishads) and Hunar (with the various lower caste communities of Shahabpur), were organized in the last few years. Other intervention programmes included sensitizing rural communities about the problem of water scarcity through their own cultural resources. A cultural station is in the process of being established in Shahabpur, which is aimed at using culture as a tool for development of the communities living in the village.

Research and documentation

Manav Vikas Sangrahalaya being a part of the Centre of Culture and Change is also carrying out research projects. One project that is underway is 'Myth, Memory and Politics: A study of the language of mobilization of grassroot dalits' funded by ICSSR. Another project the museum is involved in is entitled 'Bidesia: Migration, Change and Diasporic Culture' -an international project based in three countries namely Holland, Surinam and India, funded by Netherland Cultural Fund, Prince Claus Fund and Monderian, Amsterdam. Yet another is the Modernization and Extension of Galleries, funded by Ministry of Culture, Government of India. A new gallery on the story of Bhojpuri migrants under the colonial period is also in the process of being developed. This gallery is being supported by KIT, Amsterdam and Netherland Cultural Fund.

The museum has institutional collaboration with various institutions working in the field of culture like IGRMS, Bhopal; NCZCC, Allahabad; Anand Bhawan, Allahabad; Department of Culture, UP government and government of India, and KIT Tropen Museum, Amsterdam.

Kumbh Research Centre 
In 2020, the government of Uttar Pradesh created the "Kumbh Research Centre." As the Kumbh Mela happens nearby every six years, the Uttar Pradesh government and GBPSSI leadership decided to house a permanent research centre at GBPSSI; research from previous Kumbh Melas can be securely stored and available in one central location, and which would sponsor future research

Research 
The institute in its thirty third year, continues to pursue its research in the area of contemporary relevance, moving from local to global and back to local concerns transversing in the heterogeneity of time and space. The research extends into the changing scenario of India and a de-territorialized global socio-cultural world. One of the thematic areas of research emerging in the institute is around various kinds of marginalities produced by the traditional structures and the globalizing world.

References

Research institutes in Uttar Pradesh
Social science institutes
Education in Allahabad
Science and technology in Allahabad
1980 establishments in Uttar Pradesh